Marikana is a town near Rustenburg, North West Province, South Africa.

Marikana may also refer to:

 Marikana massacre during 2012 miners' strike at Lonmin platinum mines
 Marikana land occupation (Cape Town), in the township of Philippi East, South Africa
 Marikana land occupation (Durban) in the township of Cato Crest, South Africa

Disambiguation pages